Thomas Patrick O'Brien (born April 12, 1965) has been an American actor since the age of sixteen, having first trained at the American Conservatory Theater in San Francisco, where he appeared in ACT's mainstage productions of The Holdup; and A Midsummer Night's Dream as Puck, opposite Annette Bening.

O'Brien's feature film acting credits include his feature film debut in The Big Easy and The Accused (1988), opposite Jodie Foster.

In 2004, he established Irreverent Media Ltd. in Vancouver, British Columbia, Canada. Irreverent's feature slate includes the magical romantic comedy Best Restaurant. It is a co-creative with Vancouver-based Fractious Tribes Productions.

Filmography

Actor

Supernatural (2008) (TV Series) as Clark Adams in episode "Long Distance Caller" / dir. Robert Singer
Stargate: SG-1 (2004)(TV Series) as Brian Vogler in episode "Covenant" / dir. Martin Wood
Stephen King's Dead Zone (2004)(TV Series) recurring as Dr. Jaeger opposite Anthony Michael Hall in episode "Tipping Point"
The Perfect Husband: The Laci Peterson Story (2004)(TV Movie) as Detective Frank Ross
DC Sniper: 23 Days of Fear (2003)(TV Movie) as Lieutenant Jacobs opposite Charles Dutton
Smallville (2002)(TV Series) recurring as reporter Roger Nixon (5 episodes)
Philly (2001)(TV Series) as Tom McGuire in episode "Light My Fire"
Charmed (2001)(TV Series) as Zile in episode "Bride and Gloom"
CSI: Crime Scene Investigation (2001)(TV Series) as Max Duncan in episode "And Then There Were None"
Facade (2000) as Bob Kelner opposite Eric Roberts / dir. Carl Colpaert
Strange World (1999)(TV Series) as Daryl Jamison / dir. Peter Markle
The Strip (1999)(TV Series) as Tony Kalunian (2 episodes)
NYPD Blue (1998)(TV Series) as Gary Walker in episode "A Box of Wendy" / dir. Mark Tinker
Daybreak (1998)(TV Series) pilot regular / dir. Tucker Gates
Soldier of Fortune, Inc. (1998)(TV Series) as Wayne Chandler in episode "Double-Edged Sword"
The X-Files (1997)(TV Series) as Sgt. Louis Frisch in episodes "Max" and "Tempus Fugit" / dirs. Rob Bowman and Kim Manners
Dark Skies (1997)(TV Series) as Kellog in episode "White Rabbit"
JAG (1997)(TV Series) as Captain Cahill in episode "We the People"
Timecop (1997)(TV Series) recurring as Ian Pascoe (3 episodes)
The Big Easy (1996)(TV Series) Guest Star
The Last Best Place (1996)(TV Movie) Jake
Maloney (1996)(TV Series) as Henry Vanderwald in episode "Night of the Gardenia"
Early Edition (1996)(TV Series) as Kurt Porter in episode "Gun"
Murder She Wrote (1995)(TV Series) as Jason Giles in episode "Home Care"
Baby Brokers (1994)(TV Movie) as Frankie Dees / dir. Mimi Leder
For Love and Glory (1993)(TV Movie) as Christian Morgan / dir. Roger Young
Crash Landing: The Rescue of Flight 232 (1992)(TV Movie) as Chris Porter opposite Charlton Heston / dir. Lamont Johnson
Son of the Morning Star (1991)(TV Mini-Series) as Charlie Reynolds / dir. Mike Robe
Bar Girls (1990) as Jack Gallagher / dir. Eric Laneuville
Love and Lies (1990) as Tom / dir. Roger Young
Island Son (1990)(TV Series) Guest Star in episode "Icarus Falling"
Storm and Sorrow (1990) as John Roskelly / dir. Richard A. Colla
Flashback (1990) as Agent Phil Praeger / dir. Franco Amurri
The Young Riders (1989)(TV Series) as Jed in episode "False Colors"
Men (1989), ABC series regular as Officer Danny McDaniel
Physical Evidence (1989), as Matt Farley with Burt Reynolds and Theresa Russell
The Accused (1988), as Best Actress Academy Award Winner Jodie Foster's boyfriend Larry
Satisfaction (1988), as Hubba Lee with Justine Bateman
The Big Easy (1987), as Bobby McSwain / dir. Jim McBride
Moonlighting (1987)(TV Series) as Inmate in episode "Cool Hand Dave: Part 1"
21 Jump Street (1987)(TV Series) as Jake Whitaker/Danny Jacobson in episode "Low and Away"
Stingray (1987)(TV Series) as Joey Lane in episode "Bring Me the Hand That Hit Me"
Thirtysomething (1987)(TV Series) as Dave Firland, the Carpenter in episode "Housewarming"
The Twilight Zone (1986)(TV Series) as Mickey Shaunessy in episode "The Convict's Piano"
L.A. Law (1986)(TV Series Pilot), as Justin Pregerson / dir. Gregory Hoblit
Call to Glory (1984)(TV Series Pilot), ABC series regular as Patrick Thomas

Producer

Coordinates (2010) Writer-Producer
Gone Green (2010) Screenwriter-Producer
Best Restaurant (2009) Producer
Sleeptalkers (2008) Producer
Gang of Love (2005)(Short) Producer
The Cellar (2004)(Short) Producer
Probie (2003)(Short) Producer

Stage

School Inc. (2006) Little Tramp Theatre in Vancouver, British Columbia
A Dog Called Bitch (2004) title role, The Vancouver Fringe Festival / dir. Michael P. Northey
1918 (1989) The American Conservatory Theater / dir. Sabin Epstein
Da Carravaggio (1986) as Michelangelo Di Carravaggio - Manhattan Class Company
Mass Appeal (1984) The American Conservatory Theater / dir. William Ball
A Christmas Carol (1984) The American Conservatory Theater / dir. Eugene Barconi
The Sleeping Prince (1984) The American Conservatory Theater
A Midsummer Night's Dream (1984) as Puck, The American Conservatory Theater / dir. James Edmondson
The Holdup (1983) The American Conservatory Theater / dir. Edward Hastings

External links

1965 births
American male film actors
American male television actors
Male actors from Burbank, California
Living people